{{Speciesbox 
| image = Fish4260 - Flickr - NOAA Photo Library.jpg
| status = LC
| status_system = IUCN3.1
| status_ref = 
| taxon = Gobionellus oceanicus
| authority = (Pallas, 1770)
| synonyms = *Gobius oceanicus' Pallas, 1770 Gobius lanceolatus Bloch, 1783 Gobius bacalaus Valenciennes, 1837 Gobionellus hastatus Girard, 1858 Paroxyurichthys typus Bleeker, 1876 Gobius bayamonensis Evermann & Marsh, 1899 Gobionellus gracillimus Ginsburg, 1953 
| synonyms_ref = 
}}

The highfin goby (Gobionellus oceanicus'') is a species of fish belonging to the family Gobiidae.

Description 
The highfin goby has a very long, thin body with a rounded snout. The species has a number of lightly marked lateral streaks along its body, called melanophores, which are variably present and variably paired on both sides of the body. Usually, the markings are indistinct and missing certain stripes.

Distribution and habitat 
The highfin goby ranges north from Virginia, and rarely New Jersey, to southern Brazil. The species can be found in both freshwater and brackish water ranging in temperature from 11 °C - 29 °C

References 

1.	Benjamin Victor. Coral Reef Fishes. Ocean Science Foundation, February 18, 2015. Web. February, 18, 2015.

Gobionellinae
Fish described in 1770